The United States Strategic Bombing Survey (USSBS) was a written report created by a board of experts assembled to produce an impartial assessment of the effects of the Anglo-American strategic bombing of Nazi Germany during the European theatre of World War II. After publishing its report, the Survey members then turned their attention to the war efforts against Imperial Japan during the Pacific War, including a separate section on the recent use of the atomic bomb, Little Boy.

In total, the reports contained 208 volumes for Europe and another 108 for the Pacific, comprising thousands of pages. The reports' conclusions were generally favorable about the contributions of Allied strategic bombing towards victory, calling it "decisive".

A majority of the Survey's members were civilians in positions of influence on the various committees of the survey. Only one position of some influence was given to a prominent military officer, USAAF General Orvil A. Anderson, and that only in an advisory capacity. Anderson was the only one on the survey board who knew about procedures of strategic bombing as Jimmy Doolittle's former deputy commander of operations. While the Board was not associated with any branch of the military, it was established by General Hap Arnold along with Carl A. Spaatz. Failing to obtain the prominent public figure he had hoped for, Arnold settled for Franklin D'Olier.

Europe
The Survey team was formed on 3 November 1944 by Secretary of War Henry Stimson in response to a directive by President Roosevelt. The headquarters was in Teddington, England. The sociologist, Charles Fritz was part of the survey team before going on to become a significant theorist in disaster research. The Survey was tasked with producing an impartial report on the effects of the bombing against Nazi Germany, in order to:

aid the upcoming campaign against the Japanese home islands,
establish a basis for evaluating the importance and potentialities of air power as an instrument of military strategy,
provide data for planning the future development of the United States armed forces, and
determine future economic policies with respect to the national defense.

The report, along with some 200 supporting documents, was dated 30 September 1945. However it was not publicly released until 30 October 1945. The major conclusion of the report was that strategic bombing, particularly the destruction of the oil industry and truck manufacturing, had greatly contributed to the success of the Allies in World War II. However, despite the overall contribution of the bombing, the survey concluded that the impact of strategic bombing could not be separated from the general collapse of Germany in 1945.

Successes
The Survey noted several successes against crucial industrial areas:
 "The Attack on Oil": This section of the USSBS presents the statistics for the Oil Plan portion of the bombing campaign against petroleum, oil, and lubrication (POL) products, particularly regarding the Leuna complex that produced a notable portion of the synthetic oil.  The survey repeats the Nazi Germany position that the campaign was "catastrophic".
 Ammunition: Production fell markedly in 1944 and the arms industry shipped bombs and shells packed partly with rock salt, as Germany ran out of nitrate, a vital ingredient. Finally, Albert Speer, head of the Nazi economy, shifted the last nitrogen from the war effort to agriculture because he believed the war was lost and next year's crops were more important.
 Truck manufacturing facilities were extensively bombed.  Of the top three producers, Opel at Brandenburg, was completely shut down in one raid in August 1944, and never recovered. Daimler-Benz was decimated a month later.  The third largest producer, Ford's subsidiary at Cologne was never attacked, but production was sharply cut during the same period by elimination of its component supplies and the bombing of its power sources. By December 1944, production of trucks was reduced to 35 percent of the average for the first half of the year.  After the war, General Motors, owner of Opel, successfully sued the US government for $32 million in damages sustained to its German plants (Ford Motor Company also demanded compensation from the U.S. government for "losses" due to bomb damage to its German subsidiary).
 Submarine manufacturing was halted.

Failures
The Survey also noted a number of failed or outcomes of limited success:

 Aviation production: "In 1944 the German air force is reported to have accepted a total of 39,807 aircraft of all types -- compared with 8,295 in 1939, or 15,596 in 1942 before the plants suffered any attack." According to the report, almost none of the aircraft produced in 1944 were used in combat and some may have been imaginary.
 Armoured fighting vehicle production "reached its wartime peak in December 1944, when 1,854 tanks and armored vehicles were produced. This industry continued to have relatively high production through February 1945."
 Ball bearings: "There is no evidence that the attacks on the ball-bearing industry had any measurable effect on essential war production."
 "Secondary Campaigns" (Operation Chastise & Operation Crossbow): "The bombing of the launching sites being prepared for the V weapons delayed the use of V-1 appreciably. The attacks on the V-weapon experimental station at Peenemunde, however, were not effective; V-1 was already in production near Kassel and V-2 had also been moved to an underground plant. The breaking of the Mohne and the Eder dams, though the cost was small, also had limited effect."
 Steel: The bombing greatly reduced production, but the resulting shortage had no contribution to the defeat.
 Consumer goods: "In the early years of the war—the soft war period for Germany—civilian consumption remained high. Germans continued to try for both guns and butter. The German people entered the period of the air war well stocked with clothing and other consumer goods. Although most consumer goods became increasingly difficult to obtain, Survey studies show that fairly adequate supplies of clothing were available for those who had been bombed out until the last stages of disorganization. Food, though strictly rationed, was in nutritionally adequate supply throughout the war. The Germans' diet had about the same calories as the British."

On German production
The Survey concluded that one reason German production rose in so many areas was in part that the German economy did not go on a complete war footing until late 1942 and 1943. Up until then, factories had been on a single shift in many industries and the German economy was generally inefficient and not operating at full capacity. They also noted that women's participation in the manufacturing field remained low, lower than during World War I. The sections of the Survey regarding the German production system remain one of the best resources on the topic.

Pacific
After the European report was completed, the Survey turned its attention to the Pacific campaign. The report opens with a discussion of the Japanese strategic plans, which were based on an initial victory against the U.S. Navy which would upset any U.S. plans in the Pacific for an estimated 18 months to 2 years. During this time, they planned to "speedily extract bauxite, oil, rubber and metals from Malaya, Burma, the Philippines and the Dutch East Indies, and ship these materials to Japan for processing". They also noted the belief that high casualties would not be accepted by the U.S. democracy, and that if the initial campaigns were successful, a negotiated peace was possible.

Against shipping
The Survey received sufficient information to detail every ship used by the Japanese during the war. They noted that the Imperial Japanese Navy began the war with 381 warships of approximately 1,271,000 tons, and completed another 816 ships of 1,048,000 tons during the war. Of these, 1,744,000 tons were sunk; "625,000 tons were sunk by Navy and Marine aircraft, 375,000 tons by submarines, 183,000 tons by surface vessels, 55,000 tons by Army aircraft, and 65,000 tons by various agents".

The Japanese merchant fleet was likewise destroyed. They started the war with 6,000,000 tons of merchant ships over 500 tons gross weight, which was alone not sufficient to provide for the wartime economy. Another 4,100,000 tons were constructed, captured or requisitioned. However, 8,900,000 tons were sunk, the vast majority of their fleet. Of this, "54.7 percent of this total was attributable to submarines, 16.3 percent to carrier based planes, 10.2 percent to Army land-based planes and 4.3 percent to Navy and Marine land-based planes, 9.3 percent to mines (largely dropped by B-29s), less than 1 percent to surface gunfire and the balance of 4 percent to marine accidents." The Allied submarine campaign played the largest role, while naval mining by air in Operation Starvation also played a significant role, sinking or damaging more than 1,250,000 tons.

Against the home islands
In total, Allied aircraft dropped 656,400 tons of bombs on Japanese targets, 160,800 tons on the home islands. This was much smaller than the 2,770,000 tons dropped over Europe, or even the 1,415,745 tons on Germany.

After initial attacks from high-altitude precision bombing in which less than 10% of the bombs fell near their targets, Allied air forces switched to low-level night-time incendiary attacks against Japanese cities. On the night of 9–10 March 1945,  of downtown Tokyo were burned out and tens of thousands were killed by U.S. Army Air Forces B-29s. The Survey estimated that 88,000 died, while the Tokyo Fire Department estimated 97,000. Historian Richard Rhodes estimated more than 100,000, though journalist Mark Selden considered even this figure to be too low. The Survey notes that these attacks had little direct effect on manufacturing, with factories that were hit by bombs having less drop off in production than those that did not. However, they also noted that production dropped by 54% during this period due to the effects of bombing: the killing, injuring and dehousing of the workers as well as the destruction of the transportation network. Further, many of the houses destroyed in the bombing contained small shops that made parts for factories, so the bombing of residential districts also destroyed this decentralized manufacturing. They noted a precipitous reduction in food availability as well, dropping from about 2,000 calories per day at the start of the war, to 1,680 for industrial workers at the height of the campaign, and less for non-essential workers.

Atomic bombing
The Survey dedicates a separate section of the reports to the atomic bombings of Hiroshima and Nagasaki.

In Hiroshima (August 6, 1945), approximately 60,000 to 70,000 people were killed, and 50,000 were injured. This is out of a pre-war population of about 340,000 that had been reduced to 245,000 through evacuations. Of approximately 90,000 buildings in the city, 65,000 were rendered unusable and almost all the remainder received at least light superficial damage.

In Nagasaki (August 9, 1945), approximately 40,000 persons were killed or missing and a like number injured. This was from a population of about 285,000, which had been reduced to around 230,000 by August 1945. Of the 52,000 residential buildings in Nagasaki, 14,000 were totally destroyed and a further 5,400 badly damaged. The vast majority of Nagasaki's industrial output was from the Mitsubishi factories and steel plant, which were 58 and 78 percent destroyed, respectively.

Unlike Hiroshima, Nagasaki featured extensive bomb shelters in the form of tunnels cut into the sides of hills. "...all the occupants back from the entrances survived, even in those tunnels almost directly under the explosion. Those not in a direct line with the entrance were uninjured. The tunnels had a capacity of roughly 100,000 persons. Had the proper alarm been sounded, and these tunnel shelters been filled to capacity, the loss of life in Nagasaki would have been substantially lower."

The report also concluded that: "Based on a detailed investigation of all the facts, and supported by the testimony of the surviving Japanese leaders involved, it is the Survey's opinion that certainly prior to 31 December 1945, and in all probability prior to 1 November 1945, Japan would have surrendered even if the atomic bombs had not been dropped, even if Russia had not entered the war, and even if no invasion had been planned or contemplated."

Survey officers and controversy  

The officers of the Survey were:

The Forward to the Summary Report for the Pacific War said, "The United States Strategic Bombing Survey was established by the Secretary of War on 3 November 1944, pursuant to a directive from the late President Roosevelt. It was established for the purpose of conducting an impartial and expert study of the effects of our aerial attack on Germany, to be used in connection with air attacks on Japan and to establish a basis for evaluating air power as an instrument of military strategy, for planning the future development of the United States armed forces, and for determining future economic policies with respect to the national defense." 

The surveys of both the European and Pacific Wars were managed by a team of a dozen civilians, support by "300 civilians, 350 officers, and 500 enlisted men", who followed closely the advance of the Allied forces, to search for written records of German decisions before the disappeared completely.  Many of which were hidden, some even in coffins.  Three of the leaders of the European team were replaced for the research in Japan, so the accompanying table of "Officers of the Survey" includes fifteen men.   Those fifteen were selected as nonmilitary leaders, many of whom had even greater career success in supporting the development of strategic forces in the US military after the war than before.    

A review of a biography of Galbraith said that the survey "found that, contrary to the claims of the U.S. Air Force [sic], "Germany’s war production rose for much of the period when American and British air attacks were at their fiercest. An obit of Galbraith continued, 'Galbraith wrote wittily, “Nothing in World War II air operations was subject to such assault as open agricultural land.”   ... Galbraith’s boss, George Ball ... found something equally disturbing about the firebombing of cities.  The RAF’s bombing of central Hamburg, for example, destroyed many lives and many businesses in the central city—restaurants, cabarets, department stores, banks, and more.  What were the newly unemployed waiters, bank clerks, and entertainers to do?  That’s right: seek jobs in the war plants on the edge of the cities “to get the ration cards that the Nazis thoughtfully distributed to workers there.” ... [T]he incredible destruction that the British and air forces wreaked on Germany, with the high loss of human life, didn’t even have the intended effect of slowing Germany's war-production machine.  Galbraith had to fight hard to have the report published without it being rewritten to hide the essential points.  “I defended it,” he later wrote, “with a maximum of arrogance and a minimum of tact.” ... Galbraith also visited Japan, where he analyzed the effect of the use of the atom bomb.  He wrote: "The bombs fell after the decision had been taken by the Japanese government to surrender.  That the war had to be ended was agreed by at a meeting of key members of the Supreme War Direction Council with the Emperor on June 20, 1945, a full six weeks before the devastation of Hiroshima.  The next steps took time.  The Japanese government had the usual bureaucratic lags as between decision and action."'

More recent research 

The introduction to the summary report of air power in Europe noted that, "Allied air power was called upon to play many roles-partner with the Navy over the sea lanes; partner with the Army in ground battle; partner with both on the invasion beaches; reconnaissance photographer for all; mover of troops and critical supplies; and attacker of the enemy's vital strength far behind the battle line." The summary report only discussed the latter: attacks on the enemy's vital strength far behind the battle line.  Grant (2008) said, "The survey began in no small part as a way to look at the major targeting controversies (rail vs. oil, and so forth) that had so often consumed the attention of top Allied planners and leaders. Its original intent was to sweep up lessons from Europe for use in the ongoing war with Japan." 

The survey reported that the rate of production of war materials by Germany actually increased in response to strategic bombing by the Allies.  Destroyed factories were quickly reconstituted in hardened sites. John Kenneth Galbraith, who was one of the "Officers" of the USSBS, wrote, "Nothing in World War II air operations was subject to such assault as open agricultural land." When Allied bombs fell in cities like central Hamburg, they destroyed many lives and often many businesses in the central city—restaurants, cabarets, department stores, banks, and more.  The newly unemployed waiters, bank clerks, and entertainers took jobs in the war plants. 

In other words, the Allies may have obtained roughly the same benefits from strategic bombing of "the enemy's vital strength far behind the battle line" as Hitler gained from The Blitz, namely nothing -- or worse: increasing their enemies' will to resist. 

Pape (1996) studied the use of air power from the First World War into the 1990s. He concluded that air power could be effective in direct support of ground operations, but strategic bombing was a waste.  Pape's conclusions were supported by a more formal quantitative analysis of a larger set of cases by Horowitz and Reiter (2001).  The claims of Galbraith, Pape (1996) and Horowitz and Reiter (2001) are controversial.

See also 
 Aerial bombing of cities
 Area bombardment
 Carpet bombing
 Civilian casualties of strategic bombing
 Debate over the atomic bombings of Hiroshima and Nagasaki
 Technology during World War II
 John Kenneth Galbraith, one of the Survey Directors

References
Citations

Bibliography

 
 
 
 
 
 
 
 "United States Strategic Bombing Survey Reports"
 "United States Strategic Bombing Survey Summary Report (European War)", Washington, 30 September 1945
 "United States Strategic Bombing Survey Summary Report (Pacific War)", Washington, 1 July 1946

Further reading

 United States Strategic Bombing Survey. Over-All Report (European War). Washington: Government Printing Office, 1945.
 United States Strategic Bombing Survey. The Effects of Strategic Bombing on the German War Economy. Washington: Government Printing Office, 1945. 
 United States Strategic Bombing Survey.  The Defeat of the German Air Force. Washington: Government Printing Office, 1947.
 United States Strategic Bombing Survey. The Effects of Strategic Bombing on German Transportation. Washington: Government Printing Office, 1947.
 Morale Division, United States Strategic Bombing Survey. The Effect of Bombing on Health and Medical Care In Germany. Washington: Government Printing Office, 1947.
 Wesley F. Craven and Cate James Lea. The Army Air Forces in World War II. 8 vols. Chicago: University of Chicago Press, 1948–1958. Official AAF history.
 Sir Charles Webster and Noble Frankland. The Strategic Air Offensive against Germany. 4 vols. London: Her Majesty's Stationery Office, 1961. Official British history.
 Lee Kennett. A History of Strategic Bombing. New York: Scribner's, 1982.
 Alfred Mierzejewski. The Collapse of the German War Economy, 1944–1945. Chapel Hill: University of North Carolina Press, 1987.
 Alan J. Levine, The Strategic Bombing of Germany, 1940–1945 (1992)

External links
 
 

World War II strategic bombing